Abeer Singh Godhwani (formerly known as Karan Godhwani) is an Indian television actor. He is known for his portrayal of Vicky Bhalla in the comedy romance Jugni Chali Jalandhar, NK in the romantic drama Iss Pyaar Ko Kya Naam Doon?, Johnny in the light-hearted comedy Jeannie Aur Juju, Vikram Rathi in the popular serial Diya Aur Baati Hum, Kushal in the sitcom TV, Biwi aur Main and Kishan in the television series Agnifera. He was also seen in the romantic shows Dil Se Dil Tak and Kasam Tere Pyaar Ki.

Career 
He started his career, portraying the role of The NRI VikramJeet aka Vicky Bhalla in Sab TV's Comedy/Drama, jugni-chali-jalandhar. He Then Played the street smart, Adi in Color's Show, Rang badalti Odhani. He played in Zee TV's show Sanjog Se Bani Sangini as Shankar. He then entered Star Plus's Iss Pyaar Ko Kya Naam Doon? as N.K.

His next role came in the Colors TV's show Chhal-Sheh Aur Maat as Ranveer Jaiswal. Later on in the year 2013, He got the opportunity to play the magical, charming, funny, and handsome character Of Jin Johnny, In the Sab TV's Comedy, Jeannie Aur Juju. After That he got the role of Rahul Pyarelal in the Color's Show, Mrs. Pammi Pyarelal. He then reentered Jeannie Aur Juju in late 2013. After that he got to portray another Negative Role in Life Ok's Hum Ne Li Hai Shapath as a game boy super villain. He then Interacted with Sab TV again for his 3rd Time, another comedy show, Tu Mere agal bagal hai as Rohit, a negative role, but only for the beginning.

Finally he was offered a show airing on Star Plus. The very famous and popular, Diya Aur Baati hum, replacing Gautum Gulati as Vikram Rathi. In September 2014, he joined the cast of Diya Aur Baati Hum as Vikram Rathi. In 2017, he joined the show Dil Se Dil Tak, which premiered on Colors TV on January 30, 2017. He also plays the role of Kaushal in Sab Tv show TV, Biwi aur Main. He also played the role of Akshay Kapoor in the serial Kasam Tere Pyaar Ki post the leap.

In 2018, Goddwani played the lead role of Kishan Thakur in the &TV serial Agniphera alongside Yukti Kapoor and Simraan Kaur. In 2020, he made a cameo appearance Sujoy Banerjee in Sony TV's Ishaaron Ishaaron Mein. In 2022, he enter Colors TV's popular show Naagin 6 as Inspector Vijay Shukla. Since January 2023, he portraying Kairav Goenka in StarPlus' Yeh Rishta Kya Kehlata Hai.

Television

References

External links
 Karan Goddwani on IMDb

Sindhi people
Living people
Indian male television actors
Indian male soap opera actors
Place of birth missing (living people)
1988 births